A regional council is the elected assembly of a region of France.

History
Regional councils were created by law on 5 July 1972. Originally they were simply consultative bodies consisting of the region's parliamentary representatives plus an equal number of members nominated by the departments and communes.

The decentralisation programme of 1982–1983 under President François Mitterrand provided for direct election which began in 1986 and increased the powers of the councils.

Operation
The assemblies elect their presidents who preside over the meetings and head the regional executive.

Electoral system

Before 2004
Between 1986 and 2004, regional councils were elected by closed list proportional representation. The Front National was frequently left with the balance of power as a result and this led to a change in the electoral law.

Since 2004
Since 2004 three quarters of the seats continue to be elected by proportional representation with each list having an equal number of male and female candidates. The other quarter are given to the list that received the most votes. In order to gain these top up seats, a list must have gained an absolute majority of the votes in the first round. If this has not been achieved a second round is held with each party that gained at least ten percent of the votes competing. The party that wins a plurality in this round gains the bonus seats. It is common in this round for lower ranking parties to withdraw in favour of parties they have entered into an alliance with.

This can however potentially mean that a list that gained fewer votes in the first round and thus fewer proportional seats can end up the overall winner.

List of councils

Current councils 
 Regional Council of Auvergne-Rhône-Alpes
 Regional Council of Bourgogne-Franche-Comté
 Regional Council of Brittany
 Regional Council of Centre-Val de Loire
 Corsican Assembly
 Regional Council of Grand Est
 Regional Council of Guadeloupe
 Regional Council of Hauts-de-France
 Regional Council of Île-de-France
 Regional Council of Normandy
 Regional Council of Nouvelle-Aquitaine
 Regional Council of Occitania
 Regional Council of Pays de la Loire
 Regional Council of Provence-Alpes-Côte d'Azur
 Regional Council of Réunion

Former councils 
The following councils were disbanded after the merger of regions which came in effect since 1 January 2016:

 Regional Council of Alsace
 Regional Council of Aquitaine
 Regional Council of Auvergne
 Regional Council of Burgundy
 Regional Council of Champagne-Ardenne
 Regional Council of Franche-Comté
 Regional Council of Languedoc-Roussillon
 Regional Council of Limousin
 Regional Council of Lorraine
 Regional Council of Midi-Pyrénées
 Regional Council of Nord-Pas-de-Calais
 Regional Council of Lower Normandy
 Regional Council of Upper Normandy
 Regional Council of Picardy
 Regional Council of Poitou-Charentes
 Regional Council of Rhône-Alpes

References

External links
 Région Auvergne-Rhône-Alpes - Conseil Régional
 Région Bourgogne-Franche-Comté - Conseil Régional
 Région Bretagne - Conseil Régional
 Région Centre-Val de Loire - Conseil Régional
 Collectivité territoriale de Corse
 Région Grand Est - Conseil Régional
 Région Hauts-de-France - Conseil Régional
 Région Île-de-France - Conseil Régional
 Région Normandie - Conseil Régional
 Région Nouvelle-Aquitaine - Conseil Régional
 Région Occitanie - Conseil Régional
 Région Pays de la Loire - Conseil Régional
 Région Provence-Alpes-Côte d'Azur - Conseil Régional
 Région Guadeloupe - Conseil Régional
 Collectivité territoriale de Guyane
 Collectivité territoriale de Martinique - Conseil Régional
 Région Réunion - Conseil Régional
 Département de Mayotte